Georg Wilhelm Friedrich Hegel (27 August 1770 – 14 November 1831) was a German philosopher. He is one of the most important figures in German idealism and one of the founding figures of modern Western philosophy. His influence extends across the entire range of contemporary philosophical topics, from metaphysical issues in epistemology and ontology, to political philosophy, the philosophy of history, philosophy of art, philosophy of religion, and the history of philosophy.

Born in 1770 in Stuttgart during the transitional period between the Enlightenment and the Romantic movement in the Germanic regions of Europe, Hegel lived through and was influenced by the French Revolution and the Napoleonic wars. His fame rests chiefly upon The Phenomenology of Spirit, The Science of Logic, and his lectures at the University of Berlin on topics from his Encyclopedia of the Philosophical Sciences.

Throughout his work, Hegel strove to address and correct the problematic dualisms of modern philosophy, Kantian and otherwise, typically by drawing upon the resources of ancient philosophy, particularly Aristotle. Hegel everywhere insists that reason and freedom are historical achievements, not natural givens. His dialectical-speculative procedure is grounded in the principle of immanence, that is, in assessing claims always according to their own internal criteria. Taking skepticism seriously, he contends that we cannot presume any truths that have not passed the test of experience; even the a priori categories of the Logic must attain their "verification" in the natural world and the historical accomplishments of humankind.

Guided by the Delphic imperative to "know thyself," Hegel presents free self-determination as the essence of humankind—a conclusion from his 1806-07 Phenomenology that he claims is further verified by the systematic account of the interdependence of logic, nature, and spirit in his later Encyclopedia. It is his claim that the Logic at once preserves and overcomes the dualisms of the material and the mental – that is, that it accounts for both the continuity and difference marking of the domains of nature and culture – as a metaphysically necessary and coherent "identity of identity and non-identity."

Hegel's thought continues to exercise enormous influence across a wide variety of traditions in Western philosophy.

Life

Formative years

Stuttgart, Tübingen, Berne, Frankfurt (1770–1800)
 Hegel was born on 27 August 1770 in Stuttgart, capital of the Duchy of Württemberg in southwestern Germany. Christened Georg Wilhelm Friedrich, he was known as Wilhelm to his close family. His father, Georg Ludwig, was secretary to the revenue office at the court of Karl Eugen, Duke of Württemberg. Hegel's mother, Maria Magdalena Louisa (née Fromm), was the daughter of a lawyer at the High Court of Justice at the Württemberg court. She died of bilious fever when Hegel was thirteen. Hegel and his father also caught the disease, but they narrowly survived. Hegel had a sister, Christiane Luise (1773–1832); and a brother, Georg Ludwig (1776–1812), who perished as an officer during Napoleon's 1812 Russian campaign. At the age of three, Hegel went to the German School. When he entered the Latin School two years later, he already knew the first declension, having been taught it by his mother. In 1776, he entered Stuttgart's Eberhard-Ludwigs-Gymnasium and during his adolescence read voraciously, copying lengthy extracts in his diary. Authors he read include the poet Friedrich Gottlieb Klopstock and writers associated with the Enlightenment, such as Christian Garve and Gotthold Ephraim Lessing. In 1844, Hegel's first biographer, Karl Rosenkranz described the young Hegel's education there by saying that it "belonged entirely to the Enlightenment with respect to principle, and entirely to classical antiquity with respect to curriculum." His studies at the Gymnasium concluded with his graduation speech, "The abortive state of art and scholarship in Turkey."

At the age of eighteen, Hegel entered the Tübinger Stift, a Protestant seminary attached to the University of Tübingen, where he had as roommates the poet and philosopher Friedrich Hölderlin and the future philosopher Friedrich Schelling. Sharing a dislike for what they regarded as the restrictive environment of the Seminary, the three became close friends and mutually influenced each other's ideas. (It is mostly likely that Hegel attended the Stift because it was state-funded, for he had "a profound distaste for the study of orthodox theology" and never wanted to become a minister.) All three greatly admired Hellenic civilization, and Hegel additionally steeped himself in Jean-Jacques Rousseau and Lessing during this time. They watched the unfolding of the French Revolution with shared enthusiasm. Although the violence of the 1793 Reign of Terror dampened Hegel's hopes, he continued to identify with the moderate Girondin faction and never lost his commitment to the principles of 1789, which he expressed by drinking a toast to the storming of the Bastille every fourteenth of July. Schelling and Hölderlin immersed themselves in theoretical debates on Kantian philosophy, from which Hegel remained aloof. Hegel, at this time, envisaged his future as that of a Popularphilosoph, (a "man of letters") who serves to make the abstruse ideas of philosophers accessible to a wider public; his own felt need to engage critically with the central ideas of Kantianism would not come until 1800.

Having received his theological certificate from the Tübingen Seminary, Hegel became Hofmeister (house tutor) to an aristocratic family in Berne (1793–1796). During this period, he composed the text which has become known as the Life of Jesus and a book-length manuscript titled "The Positivity of the Christian Religion." His relations with his employers becoming strained, Hegel accepted an offer mediated by Hölderlin to take up a similar position with a wine merchant's family in Frankfurt in 1797. There, Hölderlin exerted an important influence on Hegel's thought. In Berne, Hegel's writings had been sharply critical of orthodox Christianity, but in Frankfurt, under the influence of early Romanticism, he underwent a sort of reversal, exploring, in particular, the mystical experience of love as the true essence of religion.  Also in 1797, the unpublished and unsigned manuscript of "The Oldest Systematic Program of German Idealism" was written. It was written in Hegel's hand, but may have been authored by Hegel, Schelling, or Hölderlin. While in Frankfurt, Hegel composed the essay "Fragments on Religion and Love." In 1799, he wrote another essay entitled "The Spirit of Christianity and Its Fate", unpublished during his lifetime.

Career years

Jena, Bamberg, Nürnberg (1801–1816)

In 1801, Hegel came to Jena at the encouragement of Schelling, who held the position of Extraordinary Professor at the University of Jena. Hegel secured a position at the University of Jena as a Privatdozent (unsalaried lecturer) after submitting the inaugural dissertation De Orbitis Planetarum, in which he briefly criticized mathematical arguments that assert that there must exist a planet between Mars and Jupiter. Later in the year, Hegel's essay The Difference Between Fichte's and Schelling's System of Philosophy was completed. He lectured on "Logic and Metaphysics" and gave lectures with Schelling on an "Introduction to the Idea and Limits of True Philosophy" and facilitated a "philosophical disputorium." In 1802, Schelling and Hegel founded the journal Kritische Journal der Philosophie (Critical Journal of Philosophy) to which they contributed until the collaboration ended when Schelling left for Würzburg in 1803. In 1805, the university promoted Hegel to the unsalaried position of Extraordinary Professor after he wrote a letter to the poet and minister of culture Johann Wolfgang Goethe protesting the promotion of his philosophical adversary Jakob Friedrich Fries ahead of him. Hegel attempted to enlist the help of the poet and translator Johann Heinrich Voß to obtain a post at the renascent University of Heidelberg, but he failed. To his chagrin, Fries was, in the same year, made Ordinary Professor (salaried). The following February marked the birth of Hegel's illegitimate son, Georg Ludwig Friedrich Fischer (1807–1831), as the result of an affair with Hegel's landlady Christiana Burkhardt née Fischer. With his finances drying up quickly, Hegel was under great pressure to deliver his book, the long-promised introduction to his philosophical system. Hegel was putting the finishing touches to it, The Phenomenology of Spirit, as Napoleon engaged Prussian troops on 14 October 1806 in the Battle of Jena on a plateau outside the city.  On the day before the battle, Napoleon entered the city of Jena. Hegel recounted his impressions in a letter to his friend Friedrich Immanuel Niethammer:

I saw the Emperor—this world-soul [Weltseele]—riding out of the city on reconnaissance. It is indeed a wonderful sensation to see such an individual, who, concentrated here at a single point, astride a horse, reaches out over the world and masters it.  

Hegel's biographer Terry Pinkard notes that Hegel's comment to Niethammer "is all the more striking since he had already composed the crucial section of the Phenomenology in which he remarked that the Revolution had now officially passed to another land (Germany) that would complete 'in thought' what the Revolution had only partially accomplished in practice." Although Napoleon had spared the University of Jena from much of the destruction of the surrounding city, few students returned after the battle and enrollment suffered, making Hegel's financial prospects even worse. Hegel traveled in the winter to Bamberg and stayed with Niethammer to oversee the proofs of the Phenomenology, which was being printed there. Although Hegel tried to obtain another professorship, even writing Goethe in an attempt to help secure a permanent position replacing a professor of botany, he was unable to find a permanent position. In 1807, he had to move to Bamberg since his savings and the payment from the Phenomenology were exhausted and he needed money to support his illegitimate son Ludwig. There, he became the editor of the local newspaper, a position he obtained with the help of Niethammer. Ludwig Fischer and his mother stayed behind in Jena.

Being the editor of a local newspaper, Hegel also became an important person in Bamberg social life, often visiting with the local official , and becoming involved in local gossip and pursued his passions for cards, fine eating, and the local Bamberg beer. However, Hegel bore contempt for what he saw as "old Bavaria", frequently referring to it as "Barbaria" and dreaded that "hometowns" like Bamberg would lose their autonomy under new the Bavarian state. After being investigated in September 1808 by the Bavarian state for potentially violating security measures by publishing French troop movements, Hegel wrote to Niethammer, now a high official in Munich, pleading for Niethammer's help in securing a teaching position. With the help of Niethammer, Hegel was appointed headmaster of a gymnasium in Nuremberg in November 1808, a post he held until 1816. While in Nuremberg, Hegel adapted his recently published Phenomenology of Spirit for use in the classroom. Part of his remit was to teach a class called "Introduction to Knowledge of the Universal Coherence of the Sciences." In 1811, Hegel married Marie Helena Susanna von Tucher (1791–1855), the eldest daughter of a Senator. This period saw the publication of his second major work, the Science of Logic (Wissenschaft der Logik; 3 vols., 1812, 1813 and 1816), and the birth of two sons, Karl Friedrich Wilhelm (1813–1901) and Immanuel Thomas Christian (1814–1891).

Heidelberg, Berlin (1816–1831)
Having received offers of a post from the Universities of Erlangen, Berlin and Heidelberg, Hegel chose Heidelberg, where he moved in 1816. Soon after, his illegitimate son Ludwig Fischer (now ten years old) joined the Hegel household in April 1817, having spent time in an orphanage after the death of his mother Christiana Burkhardt. In 1817, Hegel published The Encyclopedia of the Philosophical Sciences in Outline as a summary of his philosophy for students attending his lectures at Heidelberg. It is also while in Heidelberg that Hegel first lectured on the philosophy of art. In 1818, Hegel accepted the renewed offer of the chair of philosophy at the University of Berlin, which had remained vacant since Johann Gottlieb Fichte's death in 1814. Here, Hegel published his Philosophy of Right (1821). Hegel devoted himself primarily to delivering lectures; his lectures on the philosophy of fine art, the philosophy of religion, the philosophy of history, and the history of philosophy were published posthumously from students' notes. In spite of his notoriously terrible delivery, his fame spread and his lectures attracted students from all over Germany and beyond. Meanwhile, Hegel and his pupils, such as Leopold von Henning, Friedrich Wilhelm Carové, were harassed and put under the surveillance of Prince Sayn-Wittgenstein, the interior minister of Prussia and his reactionary circles in the Prussian court. In the remainder of his career, he made two trips to Weimar, where he met with Goethe for the last time, and to Brussels, the Northern Netherlands, Leipzig, Vienna, Prague, and Paris.

During the last ten years of his life, Hegel did not publish another book but thoroughly revised the Encyclopedia (second edition, 1827; third, 1830). In his political philosophy, he criticized Karl Ludwig von Haller's reactionary work, which claimed that laws were not necessary. A number of other works on the philosophy of history, religion, aesthetics and the history of philosophy were compiled from the lecture notes of his students and published posthumously.

Hegel was appointed University Rector of the university in October 1829, but his term ended in September 1830. Hegel was deeply disturbed by the riots for reform in Berlin in that year. In 1831 Frederick William III decorated him with the Order of the Red Eagle, 3rd Class for his service to the Prussian state. In August 1831, a cholera epidemic reached Berlin and Hegel left the city, taking up lodgings in Kreuzberg. Now in a weak state of health, Hegel seldom went out. As the new semester began in October, Hegel returned to Berlin in the mistaken belief that the epidemic had largely subsided. By 14 November, Hegel was dead. The physicians pronounced the cause of death as cholera, but it is likely he died from another gastrointestinal disease. His last words are said to have been, "There was only one man who ever understood me, and even he didn't understand me." He was buried on 16 November. In accordance with his wishes, Hegel was buried in the Dorotheenstadt cemetery next to Fichte and Karl Wilhelm Ferdinand Solger.

Hegel's illegitimate son, Ludwig Fischer, had died shortly before while serving with the Dutch army in Batavia and the news of his death never reached his father. Early the following year, Hegel's sister Christiane committed suicide by drowning.

Influences 

As H. S. Harris recounts, when Hegel entered the Tübingen seminary in 1788, "he was a typical product of the German Enlightenment – an enthusiastic reader of Rousseau and Lessing, acquainted with Kant (at least at second hand), but perhaps more deeply devoted to the classics than to any­ thing modern." During this early period of his life "the Greeks – especially Plato – came first." Although he later elevated Aristotle above Plato, Hegel never abandoned his love of ancient philosophy, the imprint of which is everywhere in his thought.

Hegel's concern with various forms of cultural unity (Judaic, Greek, medieval, and modern) during this early period would remain with him throughout his career. In this way, he was also a typical product of early German romanticism. "Unity of life" was the phrase used by Hegel and his generation to express their concept of the highest good. It encompasses unity "with oneself, with others, and with nature. The main threat to such unity consists in division (Entzweiung) or alienation (Entfremdung)."

In this respect, Hegel was particularly taken with the phenomenon of love as a kind of "unity-in-difference," this both in the ancient articulation provided by Plato and in the Christian religion's doctrine of agape, which Hegel at this time viewed as "already 'grounded on universal Reason. This interest, as well as his theological training, would continue to mark his thought, even as it developed in a more theoretical or metaphysical direction.

Although it is often unacknowledged in the philosophical literature, Hegel's thought (in particular, the tripartite structure of his system) also owes much to the hermetic tradition, in particular, the work of Jakob Böhme. The conviction that philosophy must take the form of a system Hegel owed, most particularly, to his Tübingen roommates, Schelling and Hölderlin.

Hegel also read widely and was much influenced by Adam Smith and other theorists of the political economy.

It was Kant's Critical Philosophy that provided what Hegel took as the definitive modern articulation of the divisions that must be overcome. This led to his engagement with the philosophical programs of Fichte and Schelling, as well as his attention to Spinoza and the Pantheism controversy. The influence of Johann Gottfried von Herder, however, would lead Hegel to a qualified rejection of the universality claimed by the Kantian program in favor of a more culturally, linguistically, and historically informed account of reason.

Philosophical system 

Hegel's philosophical system is divided into three parts: the science of logic, the philosophy of nature, and the philosophy of spirit (the latter two of which together constitute the real philosophy). This structure is adopted from Proclus's Neoplatonic triad of remaining-procession-return' and from the Christian Trinity." Although evident in draft writings dating back as early as 1805, the system was not completed in published form until the 1817 Encyclopedia (1st ed.).

Frederick C. Beiser argues that the position of the logic with respect to the real philosophy is best understood in terms of Hegel's appropriation of Aristotle's distinction between "the order of explanation" and "the order of being." To Beiser, Hegel is neither a Platonist who believes in abstract logical entities, nor a nominalist according to whom the particular is first in the orders of explanation and being alike. Rather, Hegel is a holist. For Hegel, the universal is always first in the order of explanation even if what is naturally particular is first in the order of being. With respect to the system as a whole, that universal is supplied by the logic.

Michael J. Inwood plainly states, "The logical idea is non-temporal and therefore does not exist at any time apart from its manifestations." To ask 'when' it divides into nature and spirit is analogous to asking 'when' 12 divides into 5 and 7. The question does not have an answer because it is predicated upon a fundamental misunderstanding of its terms. The task of the logic (at this high systemic level) is to articulate what Hegel calls "the identity of identity and non-identity" of nature and spirit. Put another way, it aims to overcome subject-object dualism.  This is to say that, among other things, Hegel's philosophical project endeavors to provide the metaphysical basis for an account of spirit that is continuous with, yet distinct from, the 'merely' natural world—without thereby reducing either term to the other.

Furthermore, the final sections of Hegel's Encyclopedia suggest that to give priority to any one of its three parts is to have an interpretation that is "one-sided," incomplete or otherwise inaccurate. As Hegel famously declares, "The true is the whole."

The Phenomenology of Spirit

The Phenomenology of Spirit was published in 1807. This is the first time that, at the age of thirty-six, Hegel lays out "his own distinctive approach" and adopts an "outlook that is recognizably 'Hegelian' to the philosophical problems of post-Kantian philosophy. Yet, the book was poorly understood even by Hegel's contemporaries and received mostly negative reviews. To this day, the Phenomenology is infamous for, among other things, its conceptual and allusive density, idiosyncratic terminology, and confusing transitions. Its most comprehensive commentary, scholar H. S. Harris’s two-volume Hegel's Ladder (The Pilgrimage of Reason and The Odyssey of Spirit), runs more than three times the length of the text itself.

The fourth chapter of the Phenomenology includes Hegel's first presentation of the lord-bondsman dialectic, the section of the book that has been most influential in general culture. What is at stake in the conflict Hegel presents is the practical (not theoretical) recognition or acknowledgement [Anerkennug, anerkennen] of the universality – e.g., personhood, humanity – of each of two opposed self-consciousnesses. What the readers learn, but what the self-consciousnesses described do not yet realize, is that recognition can only be successful and actual as reciprocal or mutual. This is the case for the simple reason that the recognition of someone you do not recognize as properly human cannot count as genuine recognition. Hegel can also be seen here as criticizing the individualist worldview of people and society as a collection of atomized individuals, instead taking a holistic view of human self-consciousness as originating in recognition from others, and our view of ourselves being shaped by the views of others.

Hegel describes The Phenomenology as both the "introduction" to his philosophical system and also as the "first part" of that system as the "science of the experience of consciousness." Yet it has long been controversial in both respects; indeed, Hegel's own attitude changed throughout his life.

Nevertheless, however complicated the details, the basic strategy by which it attempts to make good on its introductory claim is not difficult to state. Beginning with only the most basic "certainties of consciousness itself," "the most immediate of which is the certainty that I am conscious of this object, here and now," Hegel aims to show that these "certainties of natural consciousness" have as their consequence the standpoint of speculative logic.

This does not, however, make the Phenomenology a Bildungsroman. It is not the consciousness under observation that learns from its experience. Only "we," the phenomenological observers, are in a position to profit from Hegel's logical reconstruction of the science of experience.

The ensuing dialectic is long and hard. It is described by Hegel himself as a "path of despair," in which self-consciousness finds itself to be, over and again, in error. It is the self-concept of consciousness itself that is tested in the domain of experience, and where that concept is not adequate, self-consciousness "suffers this violence at its own hands, and brings to ruin its own restricted satisfaction." For, as Hegel points out, one cannot learn how to swim without getting into the water. By progressively testing its concept of knowledge in this way, by "making experience his standard of knowledge, Hegel is embarking upon nothing less than a transcendental deduction of metaphysics."

In the course of its dialectic, the Phenomenology purports to demonstrate that – because consciousness always includes self-consciousness – there are no 'given' objects of direct awareness not already mediated by thought. Further analysis of the structure of self-consciousness reveals that both the social and conceptual stability of our experiential world depend upon networks of reciprocal recognition. Failures of recognition, then, demand reflection upon the past as a way "to understand what is required of us at the present." For Hegel, this ultimately involves rethinking an interpretation of "religion as the collective reflection of the modern community on what ultimately counts for it." He contends, finally, that this "historically, socially construed philosophical account of that whole process" elucidates our distinctly "modern" standpoint and its genesis.

Another way of putting this is to say that the Phenomenology takes up Kant's philosophical project of investigating the capacities and limits of reason. Under the influence of Herder, however, Hegel proceeds historically, instead of altogether a priori. Yet, although proceeding historically, Hegel resists the relativistic consequences of Herder's own thought. In the words of one scholar, "It is Hegel’s insight that reason itself has a history, that what counts as reason is the result of a development. This is something that Kant never imagines and that Herder only glimpses."

In praise of Hegel's accomplishment, Walter Kaufmann writes that the guiding conviction of the Phenomenology is that a philosopher should not "confine him or herself to views that have been held but penetrate these to the human reality they reflect." In other words, it is not enough to consider propositions, or even the content of consciousness; "it is worthwhile to ask in every instance what kind of spirit would entertain such propositions, hold such views, and have such a consciousness. Every outlook in other words, is to be studied not merely as an academic possibility but as an existential reality."

What the reader of The Phenomenology of Spirit learns is that the search for an externally objective criterion of truth is a fool's errand. The constraints on knowledge are necessarily internal to spirit itself. Yet, although our theories and self-conceptions may always be reevaluated, renegotiated, and revised, this is not a merely imaginative exercise. Claims to knowledge must always prove their own adequacy in real historical experience.

Although Hegel seemed during his Berlin years to have abandoned The Phenomenology of Spirit, at the time of his unexpected death, he was in fact making plans to revise and republish it. As he was no longer in need of money or credentials, H. S. Harris argues that "the only rational conclusion that can be drawn from his decision to republish the book… is that he still regarded the 'science of experience' as a valid project in itself" and one for which later system has no equivalent. There is, however, no scholarly consensus about the Phenomenology with respect to either of the systematic roles asserted by Hegel at the time of its publication.

Science of Logic 

Hegel's concept of logic differs greatly from that of the ordinary English sense of the term. This can be seen, for instance, in such metaphysical definitions of logic as "the science of things grasped in [the] thoughts that used to be taken to express the essentialities of the things." As Michael Wolff explains, Hegel's logic is a continuation of Kant's distinctive logical program. Its occasional engagement with the familiar Aristotelian conception of logic is only incidental to Hegel's project. Twentieth-century developments by such logicians as Frege and Russell likewise remain logics of formal validity and so are likewise irrelevant to Hegel's project, which aspires to provide a metaphysical logic of truth.

There are two versions of Hegel's Logic. The first, The Science of Logic (1812, 1813, 1816; bk.I revised 1831), is sometimes also called the "Greater Logic." The second is the first volume of Hegel's Encyclopedia and is sometimes known as the "Lesser Logic." The Encyclopedia Logic is an abbreviated or condensed presentation of the same dialectic. Hegel composed it for use with students in the lecture hall, not as a substitute for its proper, book-length exposition.

Hegel presents logic as a presuppositionless science that investigates the most fundamental thought-determinations [Denkbestimmungen], or categories, and so constitutes the basis of philosophy. In putting something into question, one already presupposes logic; in this regard, it is the only field of inquiry that must constantly reflect upon its own mode of functioning. The Science of Logic is Hegel's attempt to meet this foundational demand. As he puts it, "logic coincides with metaphysics."

It is important to see, however, that Hegel's metaphysical program is not a return to the Leibnizian-Wolffian rationalism critiqued by Kant, which is a criticism Hegel accepts. In particular, Hegel rejects any form of metaphysics as speculation about the transcendent. His procedure, an appropriation of Aristotle's concept of substantial form, is fully immanent. More generally, Hegel agrees wholeheartedly with Kant's rejection of all forms of dogmatism and also agrees that any future metaphysics must pass the test of criticism. It is the assessment of scholar Stephen Houlgate that Hegel's method of immanent logical development and critique is historically unique.

Béatrice Longuenesse holds that this project may be understood, on analogy to Kant, as "inseparably a metaphysical and a transcendental deduction of the categories of metaphysics." This approach insists, and claims to demonstrate, that the insights of logic cannot be judged by standards external to thought itself, that is, that "thought... is not the mirror of nature." Yet, she argues, this does not imply that these standards are arbitrary or subjective. Hegel's translator and scholar of German idealism George di Giovanni likewise interprets the Logic in as (drawing upon, yet also in opposition to, Kant) immanently transcendental; its categories, according to Hegel, are built into life itself, and define what it is to be "an object in general."

Books one and two of the Logic are the doctrines of "Being" and "Essence." Together they comprise the Objective Logic, which is largely occupied with overcoming the assumptions of traditional metaphysics. Book three is the final part of the Logic. It discusses the doctrine of "the Concept," which is concerned with reintegrating those categories of objectivity into a thoroughly idealistic account of reality. Simplifying greatly, Being describes its concepts just as they appear, Essence attempts to explain them with reference to other forces, and the Concept explains and unites them both in terms of an internal teleology. The categories of Being "pass over" from one to the next as denoting thought-determinations only extrinsically connected to one another. The categories of Essence reciprocally "shine" into one another. Finally, in the Concept, thought has shown itself to be fully self-referential, and so its categories organically "develop" from one to the next.

It is clear then, that in Hegel's technical sense of the term, the concept (Begriff, sometimes also rendered "notion," capitalized by some translators but not others) is not a psychological concept. When deployed with the definitive article ("the") and sometimes modified by the term "logical," Hegel is referring to the intelligible structure of reality as articulated in the Subjective Logic. (When used in the plural, however, Hegel's sense is much closer to the ordinary dictionary sense of the term.)

Hegel's inquiry into thought is concerned to systematize thought's own internal self-differentiation, that is, how pure concepts (logical categories) differ from one another in their various relations of implication and interdependence. For instance, in the opening dialectic of the Logic, Hegel claims to display that the thought of "being, pure being—without further determination" is indistinguishable from the concept of nothing, and that, in this "passing back and forth" of being and nothing, "each immediately vanishes in its opposite." This movement is neither one concept nor the other, but the category of becoming. There is not a difference here to which we can "refer," only a dialectic that we can observe and describe.

The final category of the Logic is "the idea." As with "the concept", the sense of this term for Hegel is not psychological. Rather, following Kant in The Critique of Pure Reason, Hegel's usage harks back to the Greek eidos, Plato's concept of form that is fully existent and universal: "Hegel's Idee (like Plato's idea) is the product of an attempt to fuse ontology, epistemology, evaluation, etc., into a single set of concepts."

The Logic accommodates within itself the necessity of the realm of natural-spiritual contingency, that which cannot be determined in advance: "To go further, it must abandon thinking altogether and let itself go, opening itself to that which is other than thought in pure receptivity." Simply put, logic realizes itself only in the domain of nature and spirit, in which it attains its "verification." Hence the conclusion of the Science of Logic with "the idea freely discharging [entläßt] itself" into "objectivity and external life"—and, so too, the systematic transition to the Realphilosophie.

Philosophy of the real 

In contrast to the first, logical part of Hegel's system, the second, real-philosophical part – the Philosophy of Nature and of Spirit – is an ongoing historical project. It is, as Hegel puts it, "its own time comprehended in thoughts."

Hegel expands upon this definition:

A further word on the subject of issuing instructions on how the world ought to be: philosophy, at any rate, always comes too late to perform this function. As the thought of the world, it appears only at a time when actuality has gone through its formative process and attained its completed state [sich fertig gemacht]. This lesson of the concept is necessarily also apparent from history, namely that it is only when actuality [Wirklichkeit] has reached maturity that the ideal appears opposite the real and reconstructs this real world, which it has grasped in its substance, in the shape of an intellectual realm. When philosophy paints its gray in gray, a shape of life has grown old, and it cannot be rejuvenated, but only recognized, by the gray in gray of philosophy; the owl of Minerva begins its flight only with the onset of dusk.

This easily reads – and frequently has been read – as an expression of the impotence of philosophy, political or otherwise, and a rationalization of the status quo. Allegra de Laurentiis, however, points out that the German expression "sich fertig machen" does not only imply completion, but also preparedness. This additional meaning is important because it better reflects Hegel's Aristotelian concept of actuality. He characterizes actuality as being-at-work-staying-itself that can never be once-and-for-all completed or finished.

Hegel describes the relationship between the logical and the real-philosophical parts of his system in this way: "If philosophy does not stand above its time in content, it does so in form, because, as the thought and knowledge of that which is the substantial spirit of its time, it makes that spirit its object."

This is to say that what makes the philosophy of the real scientific in Hegel's technical sense is the systematically coherent logical form it uncovers in its natural-historical material—and so also displays in its presentation.

The Philosophy of Nature 

The philosophy of nature organizes the contingent material of the natural sciences systematically. As part of the philosophy of the real, in no way does it presume to "tell nature what it must be like." Historically, various interpreters have questioned Hegel's understanding of the natural sciences of his time. However, this claim has been largely refuted by recent scholarship.

One of the very few ways in which the philosophy of nature might correct claims made by the natural sciences themselves is to combat reductive explanations; that is to discredit accounts employing categories not adequate to the complexity of the phenomena they purport to explain, as for instance, attempting to explain life in strictly chemical terms.

Although Hegel and other Naturphilosophen aim to revive a teleological understanding of nature, they argue that their strictly internal or immanent concept of teleology is "limited to the ends observable within nature itself." Hence, they claim, it does not violate the Kantian critique. Even more strongly, Hegel and Schelling claim that Kant's restriction of teleology to regulative status effectively undermines his own critical project of explaining the possibility of knowledge. Their argument is that "only under the assumption that there is an organism is it possible to explain the actual interaction between the subjective and the objective, the ideal and the real." Hence the organism must be acknowledged to have constitutive status.

Introducing Hegel's philosophy of nature for a 21st-century audience,  observes that "contemporary philosophy of science" has lost sight of "the ontological issue at stake, namely, the question of an intrinsically lawful nature": "Consider, for example, the problem of what constitutes a law of nature. This problem is central to our understanding of nature. Yet philosophy of science has not provided a definitive response to it up to now. Nor can we expect to have such an answer from that quarter in future." It is back to Hegel that Wandschneider would direct philosophers of science for guidance in the philosophy of nature.

Recent scholars have also argued that Hegel's approach to the philosophy of nature provides valuable resources for theorizing and confronting recent environmental challenges entirely unforeseen by Hegel. These philosophers point to such aspects of his philosophy as its distinctive metaphysical grounding and the continuity of its conception of the nature-spirit relationship.

The Philosophy of Spirit 

The German Geist has a wide range of meanings. In its most general Hegelian sense, however, "Geist denotes the human mind and its products, in contrast to nature and also the logical idea." (Some older translations render it as "mind," rather than "spirit.")

As is especially evident in the Anthropology, Hegel's concept of spirit is an appropriation and transformation of the self-referential Aristotelian concept of energeia. Spirit is not something above or otherwise external to nature. It is "the highest organization and development" of nature's powers.

According to Hegel, "the essence of spirit is freedom." The Encyclopedia Philosophy of Spirit charts the progressively determinate stages of this freedom until spirit fulfills the Delphic imperative with which Hegel begins: "Know thyself."

As becomes clear, Hegel's concept of freedom is not (or not merely) the capacity for arbitrary choice, but has as its "core notion" that "something, especially a person, is free if and only if, it is independent and self-determining, not determined by or dependent upon something other than itself." It is, in other words, (at least predominantly, dialectically) an account of what Isaiah Berlin would later term positive liberty.

Subjective spirit 
Standing at the transition from nature to spirit, the role of the Philosophy of Subjective Spirit is to analyze "the elements necessary for or presupposed by such relations [of objective spirit], namely, the structures characteristic of and necessary to the individual rational agent." It does this by elaborating "the fundamental nature of the biological/spiritual human individual along with the cognitive and the practical prerequisites of human social interaction."

This section, particularly its first part, contains various comments that, although commonplace in Hegel's day, we now recognize as racist. What could be said in Hegel's defense, if one wanted to defend him, is that for him it is climate, not race, that is the determining factor. According to Hegel, it is not racial characteristics, but the climactic conditions in which a people lives that variously limit or enable its capacity for free self-determination. Hegel is not a "scientific" racist because he believes that race is not destiny: any group could, in principle, improve and transform its condition by migrating to friendlier climes. It is clear, however, that the implications of these remarks we now recognize as racist are not likely to be definitively resolved—or at least not anytime soon.

Hegel divides his philosophy of the subjective spirit into three parts: anthropology, phenomenology, and psychology. Anthropology "deals with 'soul', which is spirit still mired in nature: all that within us which precedes our self-conscious mind or intellect." In the section "Phenomenology", Hegel examines the relation between consciousness and its object and the emergence of intersubjective rationality. Psychology "deals with a great deal that would be categorized as epistemology (or 'theory of knowledge') today. Hegel discusses, among other things, the nature of attention, memory, imagination and judgement."

Throughout this section, but especially in the Anthropology, Hegel appropriates and develops Aristotle's hylomorphic approach to what is today theorized as the mind-body problem: "The solution to the mind–body problem [according to this theory] hinges upon recognizing that mind does not act upon the body as cause of effects but rather acts upon itself as an embodied living subjectivity. As such, mind develops itself, progressively attaining more and more of a self-determined character."

Its final section, Free Spirit, develops the concept of "free will," which is foundational for Hegel's philosophy of right.

Objective spirit 

In the broadest terms, Hegel's philosophy of objective spirit "is his social philosophy, his philosophy of how the human spirit objectifies itself in its social and historical activities and productions." Or, put differently, it is an account of the institutionalization of freedom. Besier declares this a rare instance of unanimity in Hegel scholarship: "all scholars agree there is no more important concept in Hegel's political theory than freedom." This is because it is the foundation of right, the essence of spirit, and the telos of history.

This part of Hegel's philosophy is presented first in his 1817 Encyclopedia (revised 1827 and 1830) and then at greater length in the 1821 Elements of the Philosophy of Right, or Natural Law and Political Science in Outline (like the Encyclopedia, intended as a textbook), upon which he also frequently lectured. Its final part, the philosophy of world history, was additionally elaborated in Hegel's lectures on the subject.

Hegel's Elements of the Philosophy of Right has been controversial from the date of its original publication. It is not, however, a straightforward defense of the autocratic Prussian state, as some have alleged, but is rather a defense of "Prussia as it was to have become under [proposed] reform administrations."

The German Recht in Hegel's title does not have a direct English equivalent (though it does correspond to the Latin ius and the French droit). As a first approximation, Michael Inwood distinguishes three senses:

a right, claim or title
justice (as in, e.g., 'to administer justice'...but not justice as a virtue...)
'the law' as a principle, or 'the laws' collectively.

Beiser observes that Hegel's theory is "his attempt to rehabilitate the natural law tradition while taking into account the criticisms of the historical school." He adds that "without a sound interpretation of Hegel's theory of natural law, we have very little understanding of the very foundation of his social and political thought." Consistent with Beiser's position, Adriaan T. Peperzak documents Hegel's arguments against social contract theory and stresses the metaphysical foundations of Hegel's philosophy of right.

Observing that "analyzing the structure of Hegel's argument in the Philosophy of Right shows that achieving political autonomy is fundamental to Hegel's analysis of the state and government," Kenneth R. Westphal provides this brief outline:

Abstract Right,' treats principles governing property, its transfer, and wrongs against property."
Morality,' treats the rights of moral subjects, responsibility for one's actions, and a priori theories of right."
Ethical Life' (Sittlichkeit), analyzes the principles and institutions governing central aspects of rational social life, including the family, civil society, and the state as a whole, including the government."

Hegel describes the state of his time, a constitutional monarchy, as rationally embodying  three cooperative and mutually inclusive elements. These elements are "democracy (rule of the many, who are involved in legislation), aristocracy (rule of the few, who apply, concretize, and execute the laws), and monarchy (rule of the one, who heads and encompasses all power)." It is what Aristotle called a "mixed" form of government, which is designed to include what is best of each of the three classical forms. The division of powers "prevents an single power from dominating others." Hegel is particularly concerned to bind the monarch to the constitution, limiting his authority so that he can do little more than to declare of what his ministers have already decided that it is to be so.

The relation of Hegel's philosophy of right to modern liberalism is complex. He sees liberalism as a valuable and characteristic expression of the modern world. However, it carries the danger within itself to undermine its own values. This self-destructive tendency may be avoided by measuring "the subjective goals of individuals by a larger objective and collective good." Moral values, then, have only a "limited place in the total scheme of things." Yet, although it is not without reason that Hegel is widely regarded as a major proponent of what Isaiah Berlin would later term positive liberty, he was just as "unwavering and unequivocal" in his defense of negative liberty.

If Hegel's ideal sovereign is much weaker than was typical in monarchies his time, so too is his democratic element much weaker than is typical in democracies of our time. Although he insists upon the importance of public participation, Hegel severely limits suffrage and follows the English bicameral model, in which only members of the lower house, that of commoners and bourgeoisie, are elected officials. Nobles in the upper house, like the monarch, inherit their positions.

The final part of the Philosophy of Objective Spirit is entitled "World History." In this section, Hegel argues that "this immanent principle [the Stoic logos] produces with logical inevitability an expansion of the species' capacities for self determination ('freedom') and a deepening of its self understanding ('self-knowing')." In Hegel's own words: "World history is progress in the consciousness of freedom – a progress that we must comprehend conceptually."

(See also: Legacy, below, for further discussion of the complex legacy of Hegel's social and political philosophy.)

Absolute spirit 

Hegel's use of the term "absolute" is easily misunderstood. Inwood, however, clarifies: derived from the Latin absolutus, it means "not dependent on, conditional on, relative to or restricted by anything else; self-contained, perfect, complete." For Hegel, this means that absolute knowing can only denote "an 'absolute relation' in which the ground of experience and the experiencing agent are one and the same: the object known is explicitly the subject who knows." That is, the only "thing" (which is really an activity) that is truly absolute is that which is entirely self-conditioned, and according to Hegel, this only occurs when spirit takes itself up as its own object. The final section of his Philosophy of Spirit presents the three modes of such absolute knowing: art, religion, and philosophy.

It is with reference to different modalities of consciousness – intuition, representation, and comprehending thinking – that Hegel distinguishes the three modes of absolute knowing. Frederick Beiser summarizes: "art, religion and philosophy all have the same object, the absolute or truth itself; but they consist in different forms of knowledge of it. Art presents the absolute in the form of immediate intuition (Anschauung); religion presents it in the form of representation (Vorstellung); and philosophy presents it in the form of concepts (Begriffe)."

Rüdiger Bubner additionally clarifies that the increase in conceptual transparency according to which these spheres are systematically ordered is not hierarchical in any evaluative sense.

Although Hegel's discussion of absolute spirit in the Encyclopedia is quite brief, he develops his account at length in lectures on the philosophy of fine art, the philosophy of religion, and the history of philosophy.

Philosophy of art 

In the Phenomenology, and even in the 1817 edition of the Encyclopedia, Hegel discusses art only as it figures in what he terms the "Art-Religion" of the ancient Greeks. In 1818, however, Hegel begins lecturing on the philosophy of art as an explicitly autonomous domain.

Although H. G. Hotho titled his edition of the Lectures Vorlesungen über die Ästhetik [Lectures on Aesthetics], Hegel directly states that his topic is not "the spacious realm of the beautiful," but "art, or, rather, fine art." He doubles down on this in the next paragraph by explicitly distinguishing his project from the broader philosophical projects pursued under the heading of "aesthetics" by Christian Wolff and Alexander Gottlieb Baumgarten.

Some critics – most canonically, Benedetto Croce, in 1907 – have attributed to Hegel some form of the thesis that art is "dead." Hegel, however, never said any such thing, nor can such a view be plausibly attributed to him. Indeed, one commentator places that debate in perspective with the observation that Hegel's claim that "art no longer serves our highest aims" is "radical not for the suggestion that art now fails to do so but for the suggestion that it ever did."

Hegel's detailed and systematic treatment of the various arts over such a great span has even led Ernst Gombrich to present Hegel as "the father of art history." Indeed, until recently, Hegel's Lectures were largely ignored by philosophers and received most of their attention from literary critics and art historians.

The more narrowly conceptual project of the philosophy of art, however, is to articulate and defend "the autonomy of art, making possible an account of the special individuality distinguishing works of aesthetic worth."

According to Hegel, artistic beauty reveals absolute truth through perception.' He holds that the best art conveys metaphysical knowledge by revealing, through sense perception, what is unconditionally true," that is, "what his metaphysical theory affirms to be unconditional or absolute." So, while Hegel "ennobles art insofar as it conveys metaphysical knowledge," "he tempers his assessment in view of his belief that art's sensory media can never adequately convey what completely transcends the contingency of sensation." This is why, according to Hegel, art can only be one of three mutually complimentary modes of absolute spirit.

Christianity 
Although his understanding of Christianity evolved over time, Hegel identified as a Lutheran his entire life. One constant was his profound appreciation for the Christian insight into the intrinsic worth and freedom of every individual.

Early Romantic writings 
Hegel's earliest writings on Christianity date between 1783 and 1800. He was still working out his ideas at this time, and everything from this period was abandoned as fragments or unfinished drafts. Hegel was very much dissatisfied with the dogmatism and positivity of the Christian religion, to which he opposed the spontaneous religion of the Greeks. In The Spirit of Christianity, he proposes a sort of resolution by aligning the universality of Kantian moral philosophy with the universality of the teachings of Jesus; in paraphrase: "The moral principle of the Gospel is charity, or love, and love is the beauty of the heart, a spiritual beauty which combines the Greek Soul and Kant's Moral Reason." Although he did not return to this Romantic formulation, the unification of Greek and Christian thought would remain a preoccupation throughout his life.

Christianity in The Phenomenology of Spirit 

Religion is a major theme throughout the 1807 Phenomenology of Spirit well before it emerges as the explicit topic of the penultimate Religion chapter. We see this most directly in the metaphysical "unhappiness" of the Augustinian consciousness in chapter IV and in Hegel's depiction of the struggle of the Church  of the Faithful with Enlightenment philosophes in chapter VI.

Hegel's proper account of Christianity, however, is to be found in the final section of the Phenomenology just prior to the closing chapter, Absolute Knowing. It is presented under the heading The Revelatory Religion [die offenbare Religion]. By means of philosophical exposition of Christian doctrines such as Incarnation and Resurrection, Hegel claims to demonstrate or to make "manifest" the conceptual truth of Christianity, and so to overcome was has only been positively revealed [geöffenbarte] by explication of its underlying, revelatory truth.

The heart of Hegel's interpretation of Christianity can be seen in his interpretation of the Trinity. God the Father must give Himself existence as finitely human Son, the death of whom discloses His essential being as Spirit—and, crucially, according to Hegel, his [Hegel's] own philosophical concept of spirit makes transparent what is only obscurely represented in the Christian concept of the Trinity. And so it makes manifest the philosophical truth of religion, which now is known.

In an essay on the Phenomenology, George di Giovanni contrasts Kant's rational faith with Hegel's rational religion. On his view, the modern role of religion consists in "expressing and nurturing spirit in its most individual forms" rather than in explaining reality. There is no longer any place for faith in opposition to knowledge. Instead, faith assumes such forms as the trust placed "in individuals close to us, or in the time and place in which we happen to live."

In other words, according to Hegel's philosophical interpretation, Christianity does not require faith in any doctrine that is not fully justified by reason. What is left, then, is the religious community, free to minister to individual needs and to celebrate the absolute freedom of spirit.

Christianity in the Berlin lectures 

Hegel's Encyclopedia includes a section on the Revealed Religion, but it is quite short. It is in his Berlin Lectures that we get his next presentation of Christianity, which he variously refers to as the "consummate," "absolute," or "revelatory" religion (all equivalent terms in this context). Transcripts of three of Hegel's four courses have been preserved, and they show him to be continually adjusting his emphases and exposition. The interpretation of Christianity that he advances, however, is still very much that which he presented in the Phenomenology—only now he is able to expound at greater length and with greater clarity upon what he had covered earlier in such a condensed fashion.

Issues of interpretation 

 questions whether Luther would have recognized Hegel's claim to Protestantism. Hegel embraces the doctrine of the priesthood of all believers with his concept of spirit, but rejects the core Lutheran doctrines of sola gratia and sola scriptura. Instead, he affirms as the "fundamental principle" of Protestantism "the obstinacy that does honor to mankind, to refuse to recognize in conviction anything not ratified by thought." On similar grounds, Frederick Beiser, while acknowledging Hegel's apparently sincere profession of Lutheranism, describes Hegel's theology as effectively "the very opposite of Luther's."

Discussing the "Hegel Renaissance" in late 20th-century Anglo-American philosophy, Beiser expresses surprise – given today's highly secular academic culture – at such a surge of interest in Hegel. For, according to Hegel, the divine is the centerpoint of philosophy. Hegel's concept of God differs from theistic conceptions found in orthodox Christianity and from deistic conceptions suggested by eighteenth-century philosophers. Nonetheless, Hegel conceptualizes God as the infinite or absolute, in agreement with the classical definition given by St. Anselm as "that of which nothing greater can be conceived."

Just how to most properly characterize Hegel's distinctive articulation of Christianity was a matter of intense debate even in his own life and, among his students, after his death. So it is likely to remain. Neither theistic, nor deistic, Hegel's god can only be articulated in the philosophical terms of the concept of spirit or his own distinctive logical vocabulary. Nevertheless, Hegel everywhere insists that his is the Christian God.

History, political and philosophical
"History," Frederick Beiser writes, "is central to Hegel's conception of philosophy." Philosophy is only possible "if it is historical, only if the philosopher is aware of the origins, context, and development of his doctrines." In this 1993 essay, titled "Hegel's Historicism," Beiser declares this to be "nothing less than a revolution in the history of philosophy." In a 2011 monograph, however, Beiser excludes Hegel from his treatment of the German historicist tradition for the reason that Hegel is more interested in the philosophy of history than in the epistemological project of justifying its status as a science. Moreover, against the relativistic implications of historicism narrowly construed, Hegel's metaphysics of spirit supplies a telos, internal to history itself, in terms of which progress can be measured and assessed. This is the self-consciousness of freedom. The more that awareness of this essential freedom of spirit permeates a culture, the more advanced Hegel claims it to be.

Because freedom, according to Hegel, is the essence of spirit, the developing self-awareness of this is just as much a development in truth as it is in political life. Thinking presupposes an "instinctive belief" in truth, and the history of philosophy, as recounted by Hegel, is a progressive sequence of "system-identifying" concepts of truth.

Whether or not Hegel is a historicist simply depends upon how one defines the term. The importance of history in Hegel's philosophy, however, cannot be denied.

German has two words for "history," Historie and Geschichte. The first refers to "the narrative organization of empirical material." The second "includes an account of the underlying developmental logic (the 'intrinsic ground') of deeds and events." Only the latter procedure can supply a properly universal or philosophical history, and this is the procedure Hegel adopts in all of his historical writings. According to Hegel, humans are distinctly historical creatures because, not only do we exist in time, we internalize temporal events so that they become, in a profound sense, part of what and who we are, "integral to humanity's self-understanding and self-knowledge." This is why the history of philosophy, for instance, is integral to philosophy itself, it being literally impossible for early philosophers to think what later philosophers, afforded all the riches of their predecessors, could think—and perhaps, with this distance, work through more thoroughly or consistently. From a later perspective, for instance, it becomes apparent that the concept of personhood includes the implication of universality such as renders contradictory any interpretation or implementation that extends it to some people, but not to others.

In the Introduction to his Lectures on the Philosophy of World History, simplifying his own account, Hegel divides human history into three epochs. In what he calls the "Oriental" world, one person (the pharaoh or emperor) was free. In the Greco-Roman world, some people (moneyed citizens) were free. In the "Germanic" world (that is, European Christendom) all persons are free.

In his discussion of the ancient world, Hegel provides a heavily qualified defense of slavery. As he puts it elsewhere, "slavery occurs in a transitional phase between the natural human existence and the truly ethical condition; it occurs in a world where a wrong is still right. Here, the wrong is valid, so that the position it occupies is a necessary one." Hegel is clear, however, that there is an unconditional moral demand to reject the institution of slavery, and that slavery is incompatible with the rational state and the essential freedom of every individual.

Some commentators – most notably, Alexandre Kojève and Francis Fukuyama – have understood Hegel to claim that, having achieved a fully universal concept of freedom, history is complete, that it has reached its conclusion. Against this, however, it can be objected that freedom may yet be expanded in terms both of its scope and its content. We have, since Hegel's day, expanded the scope of our concept freedom to acknowledge the rightful inclusion of women, formerly enslaved or colonized peoples, the mentally ill, and those who do not conform to conservative norms with respect to sexual preference or gender identity, among others. As to the content of freedom, the United Nations' International Bill of Human Rights, just for instance, expands the concept of freedom beyond what Hegel himself articulated. Additionally, although Hegel consistently presents his philosophical histories as East-to-West narratives, scholars such as J. M. Fritzman argue that, not only is this prejudice is quite incidental to the substance of Hegel's philosophical position, but that – with India now the world's largest democracy, for instance, or with South Africa's mighty efforts to transcend apartheid – we may already be witnessing the movement of freedom back to the East.

Dialectics, speculation, idealism

Hegel is often credited with proceeding according to a "dialectical method"; in point of fact, however, Hegel characterizes his philosophy as "speculative" (spekulativ), rather than dialectical, and uses the term "dialectical" only "quite rarely." This is because, although "Dialektik sometimes stands for the entire movement of the self-articulation of meaning or thought, this term refers more specifically to the self-negation of the determinations of the understanding (Verstand), when they are thought through in their fixedness and opposition."

By contrast, "Hegel describes correct thinking as the methodical interplay of three moments[:] 
(a) abstract and intellectual (verständig), 
(b) dialectical or negatively rational (negativvernünftig), and 
(c) speculative or positively rational (positivvernünfig)."

For example, self-consciousness is "the concept that consciousness has of itself. Thus in this case concept and referent coincide:... 'self-consciousness' refers to mind's taking on the self-contradictory (and thus also self-negating) role of being subject and object of one and the same act of cognition—simultaneously and in the same respect." Hence it is a speculative concept.

According to Beiser, "if Hegel has any methodology at all, it appears to be an anti-methodology, a method to suspend all methods." Hegel's term "dialectic" must be understood with reference to the concept of the object of investigation. What must be grasped is "the 'self-organization' of the subject matter, its 'inner necessity' and 'inherent movement. Hegel renounces all external methods such as could be "applied" to some subject matter.

The dialectical character of Hegel's speculative procedure often makes his position on any given issue quite difficult to characterize. Instead of seeking to answer a question or solve a problem directly, he frequently recasts it by showing, for instance, "how the dichotomy underlying the dispute is false, and that it is therefore possible to integrate elements from both positions." Speculative thought preserves what is true from apparently opposing theories in a process that Hegel terms "sublation."

To "sublate" (aufheben) has three main senses:
'to raise, to hold, life up';
'to annul, abolish, destroy, cancel, suspend'; and,
'to keep, save, preserve.'

Hegel generally uses the term in all three senses, with particular emphasis on the second two, in which apparent contradictions are speculatively overcome. His word for what is sublated is "moment" (das Moment, in the neuter), which denotes "an essential feature or aspect of a whole conceived as a static system, and an essential phase in a whole conceived as a dialectical movement or process." (When Hegel describes something as "contradictory," what he means is that it is not independently self-sustaining on its own terms, and so it can only be comprehended [begreifen] as a moment of a larger whole.)

According to Hegel, to think the finite as a moment of the whole, rather than an independently self-determined existent, is what it means to grasp it as idealized (das Ideelle). Idealism, then, "is the doctrine that finite entities are ideal (ideell): they depend not on themselves for their existence but on some larger self-sustaining entity [i.e., the whole] that underlies or embraces them."

The pronoun-expressions – moment, sublate, and idealize – are characteristic of Hegel's account of idealism. They can be understood as stages of thought in which the "object is conceptually present first in mere adumbration, then according to circumstances both internal and external to it, and finally standing completely on its own." This phenomenological and conceptual analysis distinguishes Hegel's idealism from Kant's transcendental idealism and Berkeley's mentalistic idealism. In contrast to those positions, Hegel's idealism is entirely compatible with realism and non-mechanistic naturalism. This position rejects empiricism as an a priori account of knowledge, but it is in no way opposed to the philosophical legitimacy of empirical knowledge. Hegel's idealistic contention, which he claims to demonstrate, is that being itself is rational.

Although it is not incorrect to refer to Hegel's philosophy as "absolute idealism," this moniker was at the time more associated with Schelling, and Hegel himself is documented as employing it with reference to his own philosophy only three times.

According to Hegel, "every philosophy is essentially idealism." This claim is based on the assumption, which Hegel claims to demonstrate, that conceptualization is present at all cognitive levels. For to completely deny this would undermine trust in the conceptual capacities necessary for objective knowledge—and so would lead to total skepticism. Hence, according to Robert Stern, Hegel's idealism, "amounts to a form of conceptual realism, understood as 'the belief that concepts are part of the structure of reality.

Criticism and legacy 
Hegel's influence on subsequent philosophical developments has been enormous. In late nineteenth- and early twentieth-century England, a school known as British idealism propounded a version of absolute idealism in direct engagement with Hegel's texts. Prominent members included J. M. E. McTaggart, R. G. Collingwood, and G. R. G. Mure. Separately, some philosophers such as Marx, Dewey, Derrida, Adorno, and Gadamer have selectively developed Hegelian ideas into their own philosophical programs. Others have developed their positions in opposition to Hegel's system. These include, for instance, such diverse philosophers as Kierkegaard, Russell, G. E. Moore, and Foucault. In theology, Hegel's influence marks the work of Karl Barth and Dietrich Bonhoeffer. These names, however, constitute only a small sample of some of the more important figures who have developed their thought in engagement with the philosophy of Hegel.

"Right" vs. "Left" Hegelianism 
Some historians present Hegel's influence as divided into two opposing camps, right and left. The Right Hegelians, the allegedly direct disciples of Hegel at the Friedrich-Wilhelms-Universität, advocated a Protestant orthodoxy and the political conservatism of the post-Napoleon Restoration period. The Left Hegelians, also known as the Young Hegelians, interpreted Hegel in a revolutionary sense, leading to an advocation of atheism in religion and liberal democracy in politics. Recent studies, however, have questioned this paradigm.

The Right Hegelians "were quickly forgotten" and "today mainly known only to specialists"; the Left Hegelians, by contrast, "included some of the most important thinkers of the period," and "through their emphasis on practice, some of these thinkers have remained exceedingly influential," primarily through the Marxist tradition.

Marxism 

Among the first to take a critical view of Hegel's system was the 19th-century German group known as the Young Hegelians, which included Feuerbach, Marx, Engels, and their followers. The primary thrust of their criticism is concisely expressed in the eleventh of Marx's "Theses on Feuerbach" from his 1845 German Ideology: "The philosophers have only interpreted the world, in various ways; the point, however, is to change it."

Although the influence of Hegel is sometimes depicted as mostly limited to the youthful Marx of the Economic and Philosophical Manuscripts of 1844, the evidence of Hegel's influence on the structure of Capital is clearly displayed in draft notebooks from 1857 to 1858 published as the Grundrisse.

In the twentieth century, this interpretation was further developed in the work of critical theorists of the Frankfurt School. This was due to (a) the rediscovery and re-evaluation of Hegel as a possible philosophical progenitor of Marxism by philosophically oriented Marxists; (b) a resurgence of Hegel's historical perspective; and (c) an increasing recognition of the importance of his dialectical method. György Lukács' History and Class Consciousness (1923), in particular, helped to reintroduce Hegel into the Marxist canon.

Reception in France 

It has become commonplace to identify "French Hegel" with the lectures of Alexandre Kojève, who emphasized the master-servant [Herrschaft und Knechtschaft] dialectic (which he mistranslated as master-slave [maître et l'esclave]) and Hegel's philosophy of history. This perspective, however, overlooks over sixty years of French writing on Hegel, according to which Hegelianism was identified with the "system" presented in the Encyclopedia. The later reading, drawing instead upon the Phenomenology of Spirit, was in many ways a reaction against the earlier. After 1945, "this 'dramatic' Hegelianism, which centered on the theme of historical becoming through conflict, [came] to be seen as compatible with existentialism and Marxism."

By confining the dialectic to history, the dominant French readings of Jean Wahl, Alexandre Kojève, and Jean Hyppolite effectively presented Hegel as providing "a philosophical anthropology instead of a general metaphysics." This reading took the topic of desire as its focal point of intervention. A major theme was that "a reason that seeks to be all-inclusive falsifies reality by suppressing or repressing its 'other. Although it cannot be attributed entirely to Kojève, this reading of Hegel shaped the thought and interpretations of thinkers such as Jean-Paul Sartre, Maurice Merleau-Ponty, Claude Levi-Strauss, Jacques Lacan, and Georges Bataille.

Kojève's interpretation of the "master-slave dialectic" as the basic model of historical development also influenced the feminism of Simone de Beauvoir and the anti-racist and anti-colonial work of Frantz Fanon.

Allegations of authoritarianism 
Karl Popper makes the claim in the second volume of The Open Society and Its Enemies (1945) that Hegel's system formed a thinly veiled justification for the absolute rule of Frederick William III and that Hegel's idea of the ultimate goal of history was to reach a state approximating that of 1830's Prussia. Popper further proposed that Hegel's philosophy served as an inspiration for communist and fascist totalitarian governments of the 20th century, whose dialectics allow for any belief to be construed as rational simply if it could be said to exist. Kaufmann and Shlomo Avineri have criticized Popper's theories about Hegel.

According to Benedetto Croce, Giovanni Gentile, noted Italian Fascist, "holds the honor of having been the most rigorous neo-Hegelian in the entire history of Western philosophy and the dishonor of having been the official philosopher of Fascism in Italy."

Isaiah Berlin listed Hegel as one of the six architects of modern authoritarianism who undermined liberal democracy, along with Rousseau, Claude Adrien Helvétius, Fichte, Henri de Saint-Simon, and Joseph de Maistre.

Thesis–antithesis–synthesis 

This terminology, largely developed earlier by Fichte, was spread by Heinrich Moritz Chalybäus in accounts of Hegel's philosophy that have since been broadly discredited. Walter Kaufmann, for instance, reports:

Fichte introduced into German philosophy the three-step of thesis, antithesis, and synthesis, using these three terms. Schelling took up this terminology. Hegel did not. He never once used these three terms together to designate three stages in an argument or account in any of his books. And they do not help us understand his Phenomenology, his Logic, or his philosophy of history; they impede any open-minded comprehension of what he does by forcing it into a scheme which was available to him and which he deliberately spurned.

Beiser's stance is even stronger. He denies that it corresponds to any procedure in Fichte or Schelling, much less Hegel.

More modestly, it has been said that this account is "only a partial comprehension that requires correction." What it gets right is that, according to Hegel, "truth emerges from error" in the course of  historical development in a way that implies a "holism in which partial truths are progressively corrected so that their one-sidedness is overcome." What it distorts is that such a description is possible only after the process has unfolded. The "thesis" and "antithesis" are not "alien" to one another. Inasmuch as there can be said to be such a "dialectical method," it is not an external one such as could be "applied" to some subject matter.

Similarly, Stephen Houlgate argues that, in whatever limited sense Hegel might be said to have a "method,"  it is a strictly immanent method; that is, it emerges from thoughtful immersion in the subject-matter itself. If this leads to dialectics, that is only because there is a contradiction in the object itself, not because of any external methodological procedure.

American pragmatism 

As documented by Richard J. Bernstein, the influence of Hegel on American Pragmatism can be divided into three moments: the late nineteenth century, the mid-twentieth, and the present. The first is to be found in early issues of The Journal of Speculative Philosophy (founded 1867). The second is evident in the acknowledged influence upon major figures including John Dewey, Charles Pierce, and William James.

As Dewey himself describes the attraction, "There were, however, also 'subjective' reasons for the appeal that Hegel's thought made to me; it supplied a demand for unification that was doubtless an intense emotional craving, and yet was a hunger that only an intellectualized subject-matter could satisfy." Dewey accepted much of Hegel's account of history and society, but rejected his (probably incorrect) conception of Hegel's account of absolute knowing.

Two philosophers, John McDowell and Robert Brandom (sometimes referred to as the "Pittsburgh Hegelians"), constitute, per Bernstein, the third moment of Hegel's influence on pragmatism. However, while openly acknowledging the influence, neither claims to explicate Hegel's views according to his own self-understanding.  In addition, each is avowedly influenced by Wilfrid Sellars. McDowell is particularly interested in dispelling the "myth of the given," the dichotomy between concept and intuition, whereas Brandom is concerned mostly to develop Hegel's social account of reason-giving and normative implication. These appropriations of Hegel's thought are two among several "non-metaphysical" readings.

Non-metaphysical interpretations 

Writing in 2005 for an Anglophone audience, Frederick Beiser states that the status of Hegel's metaphysics is "probably the most disputed question in Hegel scholarship." Some scholars favor a religious interpretation of Hegel's metaphysics as an attempt to justify Christian beliefs through reason.

Other scholars have advanced a non-metaphysical approach to Hegel that interprets his philosophy as "a theory of categories, a neo-Kantian epistemology, hermeneutics, or even as anti-Christian humanism."

If Hegel's philosophy is metaphysics, Beiser states that these philosophers believe it is "doomed to obsolescence" as a "bankrupt enterprise" now that Kant has shown the impossibility of determining unconditioned knowledge through pure reason in his Critique.

Even before this, introducing a collection of essays from the 2014 conference of the Hegel Society of America, Allegra de Laurentiis reports that everyone presenting on the topic of "Hegel Without Metaphysics?" affirmed the metaphysical dimension of Hegel's thought.

What remains in dispute, however, is how to properly characterize Hegel's (avowedly post-Kantian) metaphysical commitments. As Hegel himself remarks in passing, "humans are thinking beings, and born metaphysicians. All that matters here is whether the metaphysics that is employed is of the right kind."

Publications and other writings

Brackets indicate title supplied by editor; published articles are in quotes; book titles are italicized.

Bern, 1793–96
 1793–94: [Fragments on Folk Religion and Christianity]
 1795–96: [The Positivity of the Christian Religion]
 1796–97: [The Oldest System-Program of German Idealism] (authorship disputed)

Frankfurt am Main, 1797–1800
 1797–98: [Drafts on Religion and Love]
 1798: Confidential Letters on the prior constitutional relations of the Wadtlandes (Pays de Vaud) to the City of Bern. A complete Disclosure of the previous Oligarchy of the Bern Estates. Translated from the French of a deceased Swiss [Jean Jacques Cart], with Commentary. Frankfurt am Main, Jäger. (Hegel's translation is published anonymously)
 1798–1800: [The Spirit of Christianity and its Fate]
 1800–02: The Constitution of Germany (draft)

Jena, 1801–07
 1801: De orbitis planetarum; 'The Difference between Fichte's and Schelling's System of Philosophy'
 1802: 'On the Essence of Philosophical Critique in general and its relation to the present state of Philosophy in particular' (Introduction to the Critical Journal of Philosophy, edited by Schelling and Hegel)
 1802: 'How Commonsense takes Philosophy, Illustrated by the Works of Mr. Krug' 
 1802 'The Relation of Scepticism to Philosophy. Presentation of its various Modifications and Comparison of the latest with the ancient'
 1802: 'Faith and Knowledge, or the Reflective Philosophy of Subjectivity in the Completeness of its forms as Kantian, Jacobian and Fichtean Philosophy'
 1802–03: [System of Ethical Life]
 1803: 'On the Scientific Approaches to Natural Law, its Role within Practical Philosophy and its Relation to the Positive Sciences of Law'
 1803–04: [First Philosophy of Spirit (Part III of the System of Speculative Philosophy 1803/4)]
 1807: The Phenomenology of Spirit

Bamberg, 1807–08
 1807: 'Preface: On Scientific Cognition' (Preface to his Philosophical System, published with the Phenomenology)

Nürnberg, 1808–16
 1808–16: [Philosophical Propaedeutic]

Heidelberg, 1816–18
 1812–13: Science of Logic, Part 1 (Books 1, 2)
 1816: Science of Logic, Part 2 (Book 3)
 1817: 'Review of Friedrich Heinrich Jacobi's Works, Volume Three'
 1817: 'Assessment of the Proceedings of Estates Assembly of the Duchy of Württemberg in 1815 and 1816'
 1817: Encyclopaedia of Philosophical Sciences, 1st edition

Berlin, 1818–31
 1820: The Philosophy of Right, or Natural Law and Political Science in Outline 
 1827: Encyclopaedia of Philosophical Sciences, 2nd rev. edn.
 1831: Science of Logic, 2nd edn, with extensive revisions to Book 1 (published in 1832)
 1831: Encyclopaedia of Philosophical Sciences, 3rd rev. edn

Berlin lecture series
 Logic 1818–31: annually
 Philosophy of Nature: 1819–20, 1821–22, 1823–24, 1825–26, 1828, 1830
 Philosophy of Subjective Spirit: 1820, 1822, 1825, 1827–28, 1829–30
 Philosophy of Right: 1818–19, 1819–20, 1821–22, 1822–23, 1824–25, 1831 
 Philosophy of World History: 1822–23, 1824–25, 1826–27, 1828–29, 1830–31
 Philosophy of Art: 1820–21, 1823, 1826, 1828–29
 Philosophy of Religion: 1821, 1824, 1827, 1831
 History of Philosophy: 1819, 1820–21, 1823–24, 1825–26, 1827–28, 1829–30, 1831

Notes

Explanatory notes

Citations

References

Primary Sources 

																	
	
	
	
	
	
	
	
	
	
	
	
	
	
	 [authorship disputed]

Secondary Sources

External links

Societies 
 Hegel-Archiv 
 The Hegel Society of America
 The Hegel Society of Great Britain

Audio and video 
 Presentation by Terry Pinkard on Hegel: A Biography, 10 May 2000

Hegel texts online 
 Hegel by HyperText, reference archive on Marxists.org

Other resources 
 Andrew Chitty's (University of Sussex) Hegel Bibliography
German Idealism at the IEP
Georg Wilhelm Friedrich Hegel at the SEP
Hegel's Aesthetics at the SEP
Hegel: Social and Political Thought at the IEP

 
1770 births
1831 deaths
18th-century educators
18th-century essayists
18th-century German male writers
18th-century German philosophers
18th-century German writers
18th-century historians
18th-century non-fiction writers
19th-century educators
19th-century essayists
19th-century German male writers
19th-century German non-fiction writers
19th-century German philosophers
19th-century German writers
19th-century historians
19th-century mystics
Academic staff of the Humboldt University of Berlin
Academic staff of the University of Jena
Burials at the Dorotheenstadt Cemetery
Continental philosophers
Death of God theologians
Deaths from cholera
Enlightenment philosophers
Epistemologists
German ethicists
German historians
German historians of philosophy
German logicians
German Lutherans
German male essayists
German male non-fiction writers
German philosophers
German political philosophers
German social commentators
 
Heidelberg University alumni
Historians of philosophy
Idealists
Infectious disease deaths in Germany
Metaphilosophers
Metaphysicians
Metaphysics writers
Ontologists
Pantheists
People educated at Eberhard-Ludwigs-Gymnasium
People from the Duchy of Württemberg
Phenomenologists
Philosophers of art
Philosophers of culture
Philosophers of education
Philosophers of history
Philosophers of language
Philosophers of law
Philosophers of logic
Philosophers of mind
Philosophers of psychology
Philosophers of religion
Philosophers of science
Philosophers of social science
Philosophy academics
Philosophy writers
Political philosophers
Presidents of the Humboldt University of Berlin
Rationalists
Romanticism
Social philosophers
Theoretical historians
Theorists on Western civilization
University of Tübingen alumni
World historians
Writers about religion and science
Writers from Stuttgart